Dračevica is an uninhabited village in the southern mountains of the municipality of Demir Kapija, North Macedonia. It was originally between Demir Kapija and Besvica, but after an incident with the Turks, the villagers moved into the mountain. After the village of Strmaševo was destroyed by the Bulgarian forces during World War I, many of its people also moved to Dračevica. Today, it is merely a weekend getaway for many people and some grow their grapes in this village. It is elevated at 700 m. The hike to get there is long, but the municipality operates a mountain hut in this village free of charge. They often go there, and the forestry company operates in that area for wood supply.

Demographics
According to the 2002 census, the village had a total of 0 inhabitants.

See also 
 Demir Kapija municipality

References

Notes 
 Demir Kapija: From Prehistory to Today , p 97-8

Villages in Demir Kapija Municipality